KLOG (1490 AM), (100.7 FM) is a radio station broadcasting a classic hits format. Licensed to Kelso, Washington, United States.  The station is currently owned by Washington Interstate Broadcasting Company.  The station has been broadcasting for over 60 years. They provide information, local newscasts, local sports coverage, and sponsor a large number of community events.

Play-by-play sports

High school
 Kelso High School Baseball, Basketball and Football

College
 Lower Columbia College Baseball and Men's Basketball
 University of Washington Men's Basketball and Football

Professional
 Portland Trail Blazers basketball
 Seattle Mariners baseball

History
On August 5, 2002 the station was sold to Washington Interstate Broadcasting Company.

On April 10, 2018, the station began simulcasting its programming on 100.7 FM and also began using the FM identity on-air.

On November 5, 2021 KLOG changed their format from sports to classic hits.

Previous logo

References

External links

LOG
Classic hits radio stations in the United States
Radio stations established in 1949
1949 establishments in Washington (state)